Joshua Katz was born on 29 December 1997. He is an Australian judoka. Katz competed at the 2016 Summer Olympics in the men's 60 kg event and was eliminated in the second round by Diyorbek Urozboev.

Her mother is former judoka Kerrye Katz who competed at the 1988 Summer Olympics, when judo was a demonstration event. His older brother, Nathan Katz, also competed for Australia in judo at the Rio Olympics.

References

External links
 

1997 births
Living people
Australian male judoka
Olympic judoka of Australia
Judoka at the 2016 Summer Olympics
Commonwealth Games medallists in judo
Judoka at the 2022 Commonwealth Games
Commonwealth Games bronze medallists for Australia
Medallists at the 2022 Commonwealth Games